Betsey was launched in Bermuda in 1791. She never appeared in Lloyd's Register. On 11 April 1793 Captain William Doyle acquired a letter of marque. The size of her crew indicates that the intent was to sail her as a privateer. Lloyd's List for 1793 and 1794 makes no mention of a privateer Betsey. 

Because Betsey is a common name and she did not appear in Lloyd's Register it had not yet been possible to discover what she did between 1793 and 1798.

Captain Daniel Hayward acquired a letter of marque on 13 March 1798. Two weeks later, on 27 March 1798, Captain James Barrow acquired a letter of marque. Barrow, or Hayward, sailed from Liverpool on 22 April 1798, bound for the Windward Coast. Betsey was a slave ship, engaged in the triangular trade in enslaved people. However, the French captured Betsey before she had embarked any slaves.

Lloyd's List reported that on 3 June, the French frigate Convention had captured Betsey, Hayward, master, off the coast of Africa. Betsey had been on her way from Liverpool to Africa.

Notes

Citations

References

 
 

1791 ships
Captured ships
Age of Sail merchant ships of England